The Madison Street Bridge, or Madison Bridge, refers to two different bridges that spanned the Willamette River in Portland, Oregon, from 1891 to 1900 and from 1900 to 1909. The bridges connected Madison Street, on the river's west bank, and Hawthorne Avenue, on the east bank, on approximately the same alignment as the existing Hawthorne Bridge. The original and later bridges are sometimes referred to as Madison Street Bridge No. 1 and Madison Street Bridge No. 2, respectively.  The second bridge, built in 1900, has alternatively been referred to as the "rebuilt" Madison Street Bridge (of 1891), rather than as a new bridge, because it was rebuilt on the same piers.  Both were swing bridges, whereas their successor, the Hawthorne Bridge, is a vertical-lift-type.

First bridge

Construction of the first bridge, a wooden swing-span bridge, began in February 1890. It was built by the Pacific Bridge Company and owned by the Madison Street Bridge Company. It opened as a toll bridge on January 11, 1891. At that time, the bridge's east end was in the city of East Portland, Oregon. Subsequently, in July of the same year, East Portland merged with its larger neighbor, becoming part of the city of Portland. Later in 1891, the Oregon state legislature organized eight Portland residents into a committee that purchased the bridge on November 18, 1891, for $145,000 and eliminated the tolls. The following year, the committee won approval from the United States Secretary of War for a contract to build the Burnside Bridge nearby.

The Madison Street Bridge disaster occurred on November 1, 1893, when a westbound streetcar drove off the open draw of the bridge, and seven people died. This event remains the worst streetcar accident to occur in Portland, as well as the worst bridge disaster in the city's history.

In July 1899, the aging bridge was declared unsafe and in urgent need of rebuilding.  Work to replace the structure, on the same piers, began in December 1899, with dismantling of the trusses.

Second bridge

In 1900, the first bridge was replaced by another wooden swing-span bridge, sometimes referred to as Madison Street Bridge No. 2.  It has also been described as a rebuilding of the original bridge, because the work consisted of new truss spans mounted on the same piers.  The rebuilt bridge opened to traffic in April 1900, but retaining the original swing-span section from 1891. Because of the estimated high cost, replacement of the swing span had been postponed, with predictions that it might hold on for another year or two. However, in July 1900 it was declared unsafe by the Multnomah County Board of Commissioners, and plans to replace it with a new swing-type draw span were accelerated.  The new swing span was constructed in fall 1900, and it was made stronger than its predecessor by an additional tower built over the middle pier, connected to the outer ends of the span by iron or steel rods.

On June 21, 1902, a fire that destroyed six blocks of east-side waterfront property also heavily damaged the bridge's eastern approach viaduct, closing the bridge to all traffic for several weeks.  It reopened to pedestrians on July 18, to horse-drawn vehicles on August 5, and subsequently to streetcars. By 1907, planning was under way for the bridge to be replaced by a new structure that would be positioned at a higher elevation over the water and be constructed of steel instead of wood.  In June 1907, voters approved a measure to issue $450,000 in municipal bonds to fund construction of a new bridge.

On January 20, 1909, the bridge was closed indefinitely to all traffic, after high river levels had caused debris to accumulate around its piers, placing strain on the structure.  The indefinite suspension became a permanent one.  Plans for a new, stronger bridge, eventually to be named the Hawthorne Bridge, were firm by this time.  The Portland Railway, Light and Power Company, whose streetcars had used the bridge, and many residents of the east side, argued that the old bridge should be reopened while the new one was being built, but it remained closed.  Construction contracts for the new Hawthorne Bridge were signed in June 1909.  Dismantling of the Madison Street Bridge's structure and demolition of its piers took place in August and September 1909, followed by construction of the replacement bridge, on the same alignment.  The Hawthorne Bridge opened on December 19, 1910.

See also
 List of crossings of the Willamette River
 Timeline of Portland, Oregon

References

Works cited

External links
 

1891 establishments in Oregon
1899 disestablishments in Oregon
1900 establishments in Oregon
1909 disestablishments in Oregon
Bridges completed in 1891
Bridges completed in 1900
Bridges in Portland, Oregon
Bridges over the Willamette River
Buildings and structures demolished in 1899
Buildings and structures demolished in 1909
Demolished bridges in Oregon
Demolished buildings and structures in Portland, Oregon
Former toll bridges in Oregon
History of Portland, Oregon
Howe truss bridges in the United States
Pratt truss bridges in the United States
Road bridges in Oregon
Swing bridges in Oregon
Wooden bridges in Oregon